Bachman–Turner Overdrive is the self-titled debut studio album by Canadian rock band Bachman–Turner Overdrive, released in 1973. It was originally to be titled Brave Belt III, following the Brave Belt II album, made by the previous line-up of the group, called Brave Belt.

The album did not produce a true hit single ("Blue Collar" reached #68 on the U.S. Billboard charts and #21 in Canada), but it was certified "Gold" by the RIAA in 1974, largely pulled up by strong sales of Bachman–Turner Overdrive's next two albums (Bachman–Turner Overdrive II and Not Fragile). "Gimme Your Money Please" and "Little Gandy Dancer" were released on a double A-side single in Canada only. After the release of Bachman–Turner Overdrive II, this first album was often referred to as "BTO 1".

Track listing

Personnel 
 Randy Bachman - lead guitar, backing and co-lead vocals (5, 7)
 Tim Bachman - rhythm guitar, backing, lead (6) and co-lead vocals (5)
 C.F. Turner - bass, lead (1-4, 7, 8) and backing vocals
 Robbie Bachman - drums, percussion

with

 Barry Keane - congas
 Will MacCalder - piano
 Garry Peterson - percussion, drums, background vocals

Production
Producers: Bachman–Turner Overdrive, Randy Bachman
Engineers: Dave Slagter, Mark Smith
Mastering: Tom "Curly" Ruff
Technician: Allan Moy
Design: Robbie Bachman
Art direction: Jim Ladwig
Photography: Ed Caraeff
Booklet design: Joe Kotleba
Cover sculpture: Parviz Sadighian
Photography: Tom Zamiar

Songs covered by other artists
A version of "Stayed Awake All Night" was released by the Swiss hard rock band Krokus on their 1983 album Headhunter.

Charts

Certifications

References

1973 debut albums
Bachman–Turner Overdrive albums
Mercury Records albums